The third season of the television comedy series Boy Meets World aired between September 22, 1995 and May 17, 1996, on ABC in the United States. The season was produced by Michael Jacobs Productions and Touchstone Television with series creator Michael Jacobs as executive producer. It was broadcast as part of the ABC comedy block TGIF on Friday evenings. This is the first season to have Lindsay Ridgeway as Morgan Matthews.

Cast

Main 

Ben Savage as Cory Matthews
William Daniels as George Feeny
Betsy Randle as Amy Matthews
Will Friedle as Eric Matthews
Rider Strong as Shawn Hunter
Danielle Fishel as Topanga Lawrence 
Alex Désert as Eli Williams 
Anthony Tyler Quinn as Jonathan Turner
William Russ as Alan Matthews

Recurring 

Lindsay Ridgeway as Morgan Matthews

Episodes

References

External links
 

1995 American television seasons
1996 American television seasons
3